Pordenone may refer to:
Pordenone, a comune in Italian Province of Pordenone
Il Pordenone, Italian artist
Pordenone Calcio S.S.D., Italian football club
Odoric of Pordenone